is a Japanese baseball player. He plays pitcher. He is currently a free agent having previously played for the Chunichi Dragons.

Mitsuma is a descendant of Heian period poet, scholar and politician, Sugawara no Michizane through his mother.

Early career

He was the 3rd pick for the Dragons in the 2015 Development Draft. On 12 November 2015, he signed a development player contract with a ¥2,000,000 moving allowance and a ¥3,000,000 yearly salary.

Professional career
On 25 November 2016, due to positive performances in the Dragons farm team including being the teams' first day starter in the yearly Phoenix League, Mitsuma was awarded with a ¥4,400,000  full time contract being added to the first team roster.

References

External links
 Dragons.jp
 NPB.jp

1992 births
Living people
Baseball people from Gunma Prefecture
Japanese baseball players
Nippon Professional Baseball pitchers
Chunichi Dragons players